Rowlett or Rowletts may refer to:

Tracy Rowlett, American journalist
Frank Rowlett, cryptographer
Ralph Rowlett
Rowlett, Texas
Rowletts, Kentucky
Caudill Rowlett Scott - architect firm
Rowlet - Pokémon